Wallace Commercial Historic District is a national historic district located at Wallace, Duplin County, North Carolina. The district encompasses 55 contributing buildings in the central business district of Wallace. It primarily includes commercial buildings with notable examples of Queen Anne and Moderne style architecture.  Notable buildings include the (former) Wallace Post Office (1940-1941), (former) Farmers Bank & Trust Company (1922), White House Cafe, Wallace Depot and Freight Warehouse, Oscar Rivenbark Wholesale Building (c. 1945), Johnson Cotton Company Building and adjacent Warehouse (c. 1945), Blanchard Pontiac dealership (c. 1945), and the former Robert Carr Gulf Station (c. 1936).

It was added to the National Register of Historic Places in 1995.

References

Historic districts on the National Register of Historic Places in North Carolina
Queen Anne architecture in North Carolina
Moderne architecture in North Carolina
Buildings and structures in Duplin County, North Carolina
National Register of Historic Places in Duplin County, North Carolina